Ford Models, originally the Ford Modeling Agency, is an American international modeling agency based in New York City. It was established in 1946 by Eileen Ford and her husband Gerard W. Ford.

Company
Ford Models was started in 1946 by Eileen and Gerard W. "Jerry" Ford. Ford was the first company to advance their models' money-owed by jobs that had been completed but not yet paid. The Ford family had the tradition of allowing teenage models who originated far from New York City to stay in their home.

The company was the pre-eminent New York agency until John Casablancas of Elite Model Management opened up in the city, leading to the "model wars" of the 1980s. Ford, like many of the original agencies of the 1970s, now has to compete with a broad field of contenders, such as Women, IMG and DNA.

The agency has represented a diverse list of models and celebrities. In 1980, the company established the Ford Supermodel of the World Contest, which attracted more than 60,000 hopefuls annually from around the world. Today, the contest lives on in the form of the annual V/VMan Ford Model Search run in conjunction with the two Visionaire publications.

History
Eileen and Jerry began the business in their home. Their daughter Katie Ford took over in 1995 after working in the agency for 16 years.

In December 2000 Magnum Sports and Entertainment signed a letter of intent to acquire Ford, but the transaction fell through. The Fords sold a stake of their agency in December 2007 to private equity firm Stone Tower Equity Partners. The firm was renamed Altpoint Capital Partners in 2009. Altpoint is operated by managing partner Gerald Banks, also known as Guerman Aliev, and owned and funded by Russian oligarch Vladimir Potanin through his holding company Interros. In January 2011 Altpoint increased its stake in Ford Models to 93%. In May 2020 Ford Models Brasil purchased Ford Models from Altpoint amidst uncertainty related to covid-accelerated industry digitalization and the lack of a CEO at Ford Models for a number of months.

In 2007, John Caplan became Ford Models' chief executive officer.

In the 2000s, the company diversified through Ford Artists to represent talent in the hair, makeup and wardrobe industries. It has also promoted itself through its social media platform, which includes the Ford Models Blog, Twitter, Facebook, and YouTube. Ford Models has also lent its name to an imprint of Random House books, which created a series of teen novels that served to try and glamorize working with the agency.

The company also diversified into the art gallery business under the leadership of chairman Guerman Aliev in 2011.

In 2019 Ford Models sued a former executive, claiming she invented a story about her husband having a terminal illness in order to have the company agree to render null the non-compete clause of her employment contract. Ford Models charged that among other things the executive was liable to forfeiture of her compensation back to the company, inasmuch as she had been a "faithless servant."

In September 2019, the executive filed a countersuit against Ford Models, claiming that the chairman Gerald Banks (Guerman Aliev) had been spending company funds inappropriately for years, and that by July 2019, Ford had over $8 million in debt. She further claimed that she had quit when she realized Banks and Ford Models owner Vladimir Potanin had close ties with Russian President Vladimir Putin.

In May 2020, Ford Models Brasil acquired Ford Models, with Decio Restelli Ribeiro set to be the CEO of the talent management agency.

Ford Artists and Ford Models

In recent years the company has diversified into other professions related to the fashion industry through Ford Artists. They represent hair stylists, makeup artists, manicurists, stylists, set designers, prop stylists, art directors, and photographers. Ford Artists locations include Chicago and Los Angeles.

In addition to the New York City headquarters, Ford Models has offices in Paris, Los Angeles, Miami, and Chicago.

Ford models

Ford's clients currently include:

 Sigrid Agren
 Monica Aksamit
 Charlene Almarvez
 Alex Binaris
 Kacey Carrig
 Estelle Chen
 Oliver Cheshire
 Sora Choi
 Hailey Clauson
 Cintia Dicker
 Daniel Di Tomasso
 Cora Emmanuel
 Kelly Gale
 David Gandy
 Kris Grikaite
 Kenya Kinski-Jones
 Sui He
 Brad Kroenig
 Alexandra Micu
 Hannah Motler
 Alison Nix
 Radhika Nair
 Giselle Norman
 Andreja Pejić
 Tyson Ritter
 Charo Ronquillo
 Miriam Sánchez
 Paul Sculfor
 Evandro Soldati
 Hana Soukupová
 Fran Summers
 Caroline Trentini
 Maddy Belle

See also
 List of modeling agencies

References

External links
 Ford Models on archive.org
 http://fordrba.com/
 Ford Models Blog
 Ford Artists
 Ford Models – New York in the Fashion Model Directory

Modeling agencies
Entertainment companies established in 1946
Privately held companies based in New York City
1946 establishments in New York City